TFcon is a Transformers fan convention held annually since 2002. The convention was created to give fans the opportunity to celebrate their love for the Transformers franchise. Now the largest fan-run Transformers convention in the world, TFcon will be held for the 20th consecutive year in 2021 with events occurring in Baltimore, Maryland in October and Toronto, Ontario, Canada in December to celebrate the 37th Anniversary of the Transformers. TFcon will celebrate its 20th Anniversary in 2022 with events happening in Los Angeles, Toronto, and Chicago.

Description 
TFcon is the world's largest fan-run Transformers collectors convention. The event features the world's largest dealer room for specifically Transformers merchandise, guest question and answer panels and autograph sessions, a 3rd party product presentation, Transformers trivia, and a Transformers costume contest.

History
The first TFcon was held in Hamilton, Ontario in 2002. Organized in less than a month, the convention had a modest 190 attendees. In 2003, TFcon got its first special guests in the form of Joe Ng and the Dreamwave Productions team. In 2004, it got its first convention exclusive in the form of a variant convention exclusive cover of Transformers #1 Vol. 3 published by Dreamwave Productions. In 2007, TFcon finally got its first transforming toy exclusive, an unlicensed and downsized version of the Dinobot Slag in his green Generation 2 colors dubbed "Flamethrower". In its first 2 years the convention was moved around Ontario, but now finds a regular home in Toronto, Ontario. As of 2008, this convention formerly named TransformersCon is now officially called TFcon at the request of Hasbro. In 2009 TFcon expanded to a 2-day convention. Starting in 2012 TFcon has been hosting a charity auction for the Make-A-Wish Foundation each summer raising over $50,000 for the charity. In 2014 TFcon expanded to two shows a year, with one in Canada and one in the United States so more fans could be included in the experience. Spring of 2019 saw TFcon hosting the first-ever Transformers Generation 1 cast reunion in Los Angeles featuring the largest reunion of talent from the original cartoon series ever assembled, featuring 50 guests from various Transformers media. In 2020 TFcon was not held in person for the first time since its inception in 2002 due to the COVID-19 pandemic and ran a virtual event.

Dates and locations
2002: November 10 – Lawfield Arena, Hamilton, Ontario
2003: June 22 – Holiday Inn Burlington Hotel & Conference Centre, Burlington, Ontario
2004: March 12–13 – Holiday Inn Toronto Airport East, Toronto, Ontario
2005: March 25–26 – Doubletree International Plaza Hotel Toronto Airport, Toronto, Ontario
2006: April 28–29 – Doubletree International Plaza Hotel Toronto Airport, Toronto, Ontario
2007: April 27–28 – Doubletree International Plaza Hotel Toronto Airport, Toronto, Ontario
2008: June 20–21 – Doubletree International Plaza Hotel Toronto Airport, Toronto, Ontario
2009: April 24–26 – Doubletree International Plaza Hotel Toronto Airport, Toronto, Ontario
2010: July 16–18 – Doubletree International Plaza Hotel Toronto Airport, Toronto, Ontario
2011: July 29–31 – Delta Meadowvale Resort and Conference Centre, Mississauga, Ontario
2012: July 27–29 – Delta Meadowvale Resort and Conference Centre, Mississauga, Ontario
2013: July 25–28 - Delta Meadowvale Hotel and Conference Centre, Mississauga, Ontario
2014: July 11–13 – Delta Meadowvale Resort and Conference Centre, Mississauga, Ontario
2014: October 24–26 – Hyatt Regency O'Hare, Chicago, Illinois
2015: July 17–19 – Hilton Mississauga/Meadowvale, Mississauga, Ontario
2015: October 16–18 – Embassy Suites Charlotte Concord, Charlotte, North Carolina
2016: July 15–17 – Hilton Mississauga/Meadowvale, Mississauga, Ontario
2016: October 21–23 – Hyatt Regency O'Hare, Chicago, Illinois
2017: July 14–16 – Hilton Mississauga/Meadowvale, Mississauga, Ontario
2017: September 29-October 1 – Hyatt Regency Reston, Reston, Virginia
2018: July 13–15 - Hilton Mississauga/Meadowvale, Mississauga, Ontario
2018: October 26–28 - Crowne Plaza Chicago O’Hare Hotel & Conference Center, Rosemont, Illinois
2019: March 13–15 - Los Angeles Marriott Burbank Airport, Burbank, California
2019: July 12–14 - Hilton Mississauga/Meadowvale, Mississauga, Ontario
2019: October 25–27 - Hyatt Regency Reston, Reston, Virginia
2020: March 20–22 - DoubleTree By Hilton at the Entrance to Universal Orlando - canceled due to COVID-19
2020: July 10–12 - Hilton Mississauga/Meadowvale, Mississauga, Ontario - canceled due to COVID-19
2020: October 23–25 - Crowne Plaza Chicago O’Hare Hotel & Conference Center - canceled due to COVID-19
2021: October 22–24, Hilton Baltimore Inner Harbor, Baltimore, Maryland
2021: December 10–12 - Hilton Mississauga/Meadowvale, Mississauga, Ontario
2022: March 11–13 - Los Angeles Marriott Burbank Airport, Burbank, California
2022: July 8–10 - Hilton Mississauga/Meadowvale, Mississauga, Ontario
2022: October 21–23 - Crowne Plaza Chicago O’Hare Hotel & Conference Center
2023: March 10-12 - Los Angeles Marriott Burbank Airport, Burbank, California
2023: July 14-16 - Hilton Mississauga/Meadowvale, Mississauga, Ontario
2023: October 20-22 - Doubletree by Hilton Hotel Orlando at Seaworld
2024: March 8-10

Special guests
2002: None
2003: Joe Ng, Roger Lee and various members of the Dreamwave Productions team
2004: David Kaye, Pat Lee, Joe Ng, James "Brad Mick" McDonough, Adam Patyk and Rob Ruffalo.
2005: Garry Chalk, James "Brad Mick" McDonough, Adam Patyk, Joe Ng, Alex Milne, Matt Moylan, Karl Hartman and Pete Sinclair.
2006: Don Murphy, Michael McConnohie, Joe Ng, Alex Milne, Rik Alvarez, Rob Russ and Erik Ko.
2007: Michael Bell, Joe Ng, Alex Milne, Matt Moylan and Matt Hansen.
2008: Gregg Berger, Alex Milne, Matt Moylan, Espen Grundetjern and Hasbro Canada
2009: Dan Gilvezan, Derrick J. Wyatt, Alex Milne, Matt Moylan and Hasbro Canada
2010: David Kaye, Mark Ryan, Derrick J. Wyatt, Marvin Mariano, Dan Khanna, Eric Bauza, Alex Milne, Matt Moylan and Hasbro Canada
2011: Simon Furman, Garry Chalk, Paul Eiding, Joe Ng, Marvin Mariano, Dan Khanna, Alex Milne, Smith Hart, and Hasbro Canada
2012: Bob Budiansky, Scott McNeil, Neil Ross, Wally Burr, Derrick J. Wyatt, Andrew Griffith, Josh Perez, Silas Zee, Dan Khanna, Matt Moylan, Ben Dolle, Chris Ho  and Hasbro Canada
2013: Dick Gautier, Jack Angel, Venus Terzo, James Roberts, Marilyn Lightstone, Livio Ramondelli, Casey Coller, Alex Milne, Andrew Griffith, John-Paul Bove, Josh Perez and Marvin Mariano
2014 (Toronto): Gregg Berger, Garry Chalk, Susan Blu (via Skype), Neil Kaplan, Aaron Archer, Sarah Stone, Andrew Griffith, Alex Milne, Marvin Mariano, Matt Moylan, Dan Khanna, Ben Dolle (Peaugh), Chris Ho (Vangelus) and a live performance by The Cybertronic Spree.
2014 (Chicago): Dan Gilvezan, Alan Oppenheimer, Venus Terzo, Aaron Archer, Bob Skir, James Roberts, Andrew Griffith, Sarah Stone, Casey Coller, Josh Burcham, Josh Perez, Ken Christiansen, Brendan Cahill and J.E “Rik” Alvarez
2015 (Toronto): Peter Cullen, John Moschitta, Jr., Michael McConnohie, Richard Newman, James Roberts, Alex Milne, Livio Ramondelli, James Raiz, Marvin Mariano, Josh Perez and Matt Moylan.
2015 (Charlotte): Gregg Berger, Dan Gilvezan, Richard Newman, James Roberts (via Skype), Flint Dille, Casey Coller, Brendan Cahill, Corin Howell and Josh Burcham.
2016 (Toronto): Frank Welker, Dan Gilvezan, Ian James Corlett, Jim Byrnes, Flint Dille, Alex Milne, Sara Pitre-Durocher, Brendan Cahill, James Raiz, Marvin Mariano, Josh Perez and Matt Moylan.
2016 (Chicago): Michael Bell, Gregg Berger, Garry Chalk, Richard Newman, Bob Budiansky, Jon Bailey, Jason Marnocha, Frank Todaro, Nick Roche, Alex Milne, Sara Pitre-Durocher, Andrew Griffith, Casey Coller, Brendan Cahill, Corin Howell, Josh Perez, Josh Burcham and Matt Moylan.
2017 (Toronto): Michael Bell, Arthur Burghardt, Alec Willows, Scott McNeil, Aaron Archer, John Barber, Alex Milne, Sara Pitre-Durocher, Nick Roche, Andrew Griffith, James Raiz, Marvin Mariano, Josh Perez and Matt Moylan.
2017 (DC): Neil Ross, Jack Angel, David Kaye, Aaron Archer, James Roberts, Alex Milne, Casey Coller, Sara Pitre-Dorocher, Andrew Griffith, Josh Burcham and Matt Moylan. 
2018 (Toronto): Hal Rayle, David Kaye, Garry Chalk, David Mendenhall, James Roberts, Aaron Archer, David Wise, Nick Roche, Alex Milne, Sara Pitre-Dorocher, Josh Perez, James Raiz, and Matt Moylan.
2018 (Chicago): Stephen Keener, Ian James Corlett, Alec Willows, Arlene Banas, Rik Alvarez, James Roberts, Kei Zama, Alex Milne, Sara Pitre-Dorocher, Casey Coller, Ken Christiansen, Josh Burcham, Josh Perez and Matt Moylan.
2019 (Los Angeles): Alan Oppenheimer, Arthur Burghardt, Bill Ratner, Clive Revill, Dan Gilvezan, Danny Mann, Daran Norris, David Kaye, David Mendenhall, David Sobolov, Frank Todaro, Gregg Berger, Ian James Corlett, Jack Angel, Jason Marnocha, Jerry Houser, Jon Bailey, Laurie Faso, Marlene Aragon,  Michael Bell, Michael Horton, Morgan Lofting, Neil Ross, Paul Eiding, Peter Renaday, Alex Milne, Brandon Easton, Bill Forester, Bob Skir, Bryce Malek, Buzz Dixon, Casey Coller, David Wise, Derrick J. Wyatt, Donald F. Glut, Douglas Booth, Eric Siebenaler, Flint Dille, Jack Lawrence, Jim Sorenson, Josh Burcham, Josh Perez, Mae Catt, Mairghread Scott, Marty Isenberg, Michael Charles Hill, Paul Davids, Ron Friedman, Sara Pitre-Durocher and Vince DiCola
2019 (Toronto): Michael Chain, Stephen Keener, Blu Mankuma, Colin Murdock, Bob Budiansky, Ron Friedman, Christopher Lee Zammit, Aaron Archer, Jack Lawrence, Kei Zama, Alex Milne, Livio Ramondelli and Sara Pitre-Durocher
2019 (DC): Paul Eiding, Dan Gilvezan, Michael McConnohie, David Sobolov, Vince DiCola, Donald F. Glut, Aaron Archer, Rik Alvarez, Alex Milne, Jack Lawrence, Casey Coller, Josh Perez and Josh Burcham
2020 (Orlando): Bob Budiansky, Gregg Berger, Hal Rayle, Victor Caroli, Venus Terzo, Vince Dicola, José Delbo, Mark Watts, Aaron Archer, Alex Milne, Jack Lawrence, Livio Ramondelli, Casey Coller, Josh Perez, Josh Burcham, and Andrew Griffith. - canceled due to COVID-19
2020 (Toronto): canceled due to COVID-19
2020 (Chicago): canceled due to COVID-19
2021 (Baltimore): Garry Chalk, Venus Terzo, Gregg Berger, Hal Rayle, Xavier Paul Cadeau, Bob Budiansky, Rik Alvarez, Livio Ramondelli, Andrew Griffith, Josh Burcham, and Casey Coller
2021 (Toronto): Jerry Houser, Lee Tockar, David Sobolov, Paul Eiding (virtually), Bob Skir, Alex Milne and Andrew Griffith.
2022 (Los Angeles): Aaron Veach, Adin Rudd, Alan Oppenheimer, André Sogliuzzo, Bill Rogers, Brook Chalmers, Dan Gilvezan, Dan Woren, Daniel Riordan, David Kaye, Doug Stone, Edward Bosco, Eric Bauza, Erin Ebers, Frank Todaro, Greg Berg, Gregg Berger, Grey Griffin, Ian James Corlett, Jason Marnocha, Jeanne Carr, Jeff Glen Bennett, Joe Hernandez, Joe Zieja, John Moschitta Jr., Jon Bailey, Josh Keaton, J.W. Stafford, Laurie Faso, Lex Lang, Linsay Rousseau, Melendy Britt, Michael Bell, Morgan Lofting, Neil Ross, Paul Eiding, Phillip Bache, Sandy Fox, Andrew Griffith, Brandon Easton, Casey Coller, Chris "Doc" Wyatt, E.J. Su, Eric Siebenaler, F.J. DeSanto, Flint Dille, Gavin Hignight, Josh Burcham, Josh Perez, Kevin Burke, Livio Ramondelli, Marty Isenberg, Ron Friedman, Stan Bush, Steven Melching, Tyler Bleszinski and Vince DiCola.
2022 (Toronto): Doug Parker, Laurie Faso, Gregg Berger, Sharon Alexander, Vince DiCola, Aaron Archer, Paul Davids, Christopher Lee Zammit, Andrew Wildman, Andrew Griffith and Livio Ramondelli.
2022 (Chicago): Peter Cullen, David Kaye, Paul Eiding, Susan Blu, Andy Barnett, Ron Friedman, Aaron Archer, Casey Coller, Josh Burcham, Josh Perez, Sara Pitre-Durocher, Ken Christiansen, Alex Milne, Joseph Kuhr, Dan Khanna, Jim Sorenson and Rik Alvarez. 
2023 (Los Angeles): Alan Oppenheimer, Andy Barnett, Benni Latham, Bob Joles, Dan Gilvezan, David Kaye, David Sobolov, Frank Todaro, Gregg Berger, Ian James Corlett, James Horan, Jeanne Carr, Jeff Bennett, Jerry Houser, Jessica DiGiovanni,  John Moschitta Jr., Jon Jon Briones, Josh Keaton, Laurie Faso, Melendy Britt, Michael Bell, Morgan Lofting, Neil Ross, Paul Eiding, Peter Cullen, Peter Renaday, Susan Blu, Terry McGovern, Tiana Camacho, Travis Artz, Wally Wingert, Wayne Lewis, Zeno Robinson, Bob Forward, Buzz Dixon, Casey Coller, E.J. Su, Flint Dille, Jack Lawrence, Jim Sorenson, Josh Burcham, Kotobukiya, Livio Ramondelli, Robosen, Ron Friedman, Stan Bush and Tyler Bleszinski.
2023 (Toronto): David Kaye, Aaron Archer, TBA
2023 (Orlando): TBA
2024 (Los Angeles): TBA

Exclusives
2004: Variant cover of Transformers #1 Volume 3 published by Dreamwave Productions with artwork by Don Figueroa
2005: Convention Exclusive Dinobots Poster and 2005 Convention Exclusive T-shirt with artwork by Joe Ng
2006: Stealth Cyclonus Hard Hero Bust, Alternate Cover to Transformers vs. G.I.Joe #1 with art by Joe Ng
2007: Justitoys G2 Flamethrower and the Alternated Masterpiece Lithograph featuring art by Alex Milne
2008: No toy exclusive
2009: FansProject Powered Commander and the Universe Divided Lithograph featuring art by Alex Milne
2010: Impossible Toys Night-bird
2011: Headrobots Stronghold, Headrobots Toxin, Perfect Effect PE-11 Night Ops Version
2012: iGear Shafter, Headrobots Garrison, Perfect Effect Shadow Bat
2013: iGear Roswell, Mech IDeas [Project Z, Mech IDeas Prototype X, iGear Van Guardian
2014 (Toronto): X-Transbots Masterpiece Shafter, Keith's Fantasy Club Pestilence
2014 (Chicago): Toyworld Transformers TW-H04G Grant, X-Transbots Axis
2015 (Toronto): TW06B – Purple Evila Star Figure LE350
2015 (Charlotte): Voodoo Robots Animus Stealth Mode, MMC Reformated Azalea * Asterisk Mode
2016 (Toronto): PS-01S Sphinx Stealth Version, MMC Reformated Feral Queen & Nero Queen
2016 (Chicago): FansProject LER-04 Severo (SP) Diaclone Edition, PS-01S Sphinx Stealth Alternate Version 
2017 (Toronto): Diaclone Paris Dakar Rally Terraegis
2017 (DC): MMC R-19AM Kultur Asterisk Mode, MMC R-27SG Calidus Shadow Ghost, Ocular Max PS-06O Offroad
2018 (Toronto): Maketoys MTRM-09GII Maestro, Ocularmax Remix Enmitus, Ocularmax Catcall and Uproar
2018 (Chicago): X-Transbots Crackup B1, Mastermind Creations R-29AM Aero Alpha Asterisk Mode, Fans Project Warbot WB011 Constructo Core
2019 (LA): Make Toys MTCD-01D Delta Manus, Make Toys MTRM-11G2 Screamer, Make Toys G2 Ceasefire
2019 (Toronto): Ocular Max PS-18 Zinnia, Mastermind Creations R-32 Broken Mirror Stray, X-Transbots MX-XVI G2 Overheat
2019 (DC): Ocular Max PS-01R Sphinx Regenesis, G2 Planet X Vulcan, Mastermind Creations Reformatted R41 Ultio, Mastermind Creations Reformatted R37 Bedrock, Ocular Max Perfection Series PS01P Pharaoh
2020 (Orlando): Ocular Max PS-04P Azalea Protoform and RMX-14 Doccat
2020 (Online): PX-14B Helios Powered Commander, Ocular Max RMX-01Co Jaguar Covert, Fans-Hobby MB-12B Wheel Blade, Mastermind Creations Reformatted R-46 Vexo Prominon
2021 (Baltimore): Newage Pistolonyx, Mastermind Creations Reformatted R-49 Mentis
2021 (Toronto): X-Transbots Master X Series Ono, Ocular Max Perfection Series PS-09IMP Hellion IMP, Ocular Max Remix Series RMX-06CO Furor and RMX-07CO Riot Covert 2 Pack
2022 (Los Angeles): Fans hobby x The Chosen Prime MB-14B Arson, Mastermind Creations Reformatted R-46A Vexo Prominon Alternative, Ocular Max Perfection Series PS-19 Grifter, X-Transbots The Chosen Prime MX-30B Fuzz G2 (sold online after convention)
2022 (Toronto): X-Transbots The Chosen Prime MX-33B Jocund G2, Mastermind Creations Reformatted R-48SG Optus Prominon Severed Geist
2022 (Chicago): MB-06E/MB-11E God Delta, Ocular Max Remix Series RMX-11EX Tempo (First Edition)

Media Reports
TransformersCon 2004 documentary appears on Metrodome's 2004 release of Transformers season one DVD set, as well interviews with voice actors David Kaye & Garry Chalk from TransformersCon appear on the Madman Beast Wars 2006 Season 2 DVD sets. TFcon was featured in the Shout Factory Season 3&4 DVD in the Special Features Featurette "The Autobots, The Decepticons & The Fans", including mention in the "Special Thanks" section of the special feature credits.

TFcon Toronto Official Website
TFcon USA Official Website
Electric Playground Television Feature
Televised YTV Shorts
Toyfare Magazine Mention
City TV Breakfast Television Guest Spot
680 News article about TFcon
Dorkshelf.com article
Mississauga.com Article
TFcon Article in the Toronto Star
TFcon segment from The Circuit on Space Channel
Breakfast Today Toronto interview Phil Gervais about TFcon 2011
680News reports on TFcon 2011
TFcon 2012 reported in the Mississauga News
Press Plus 1 report on the TFcon 2012 voice actor panel

References

External links
TFcon Toronto Official Website
TFcon USA Official Website
TFcon Los Angeles Official Website
Official TFcon message board
Canadian Transformers News and Discussion
Canadian Action Figure News and Discussion

Events in Toronto
Multigenre conventions
Recurring events established in 2002
Science fiction conventions in Canada
Transformers (franchise)
2002 establishments in Ontario